John Spotton C.S.C. (January 1, 1927 - March 3, 1991) was a Canadian filmmaker with the National Film Board of Canada.

A versatile artist who worked as a director, producer, cinematographer and editor, Spotton was best known for his role in developing the Direct Cinema genre of documentary and in the application of those techniques in narrative fiction films, in particular Nobody Waved Good-bye (1964), in which he served as cinematographer and editor.

An early member of the Canadian Society of Cinematographers (CSC), Spotton briefly working as a cameraman for a private company, joined the NFB in 1949 and worked there for the rest of his life, with the exception of a three-film stint with Parker Film Associates, and a two-year period in the 1970s when he worked with Potterton Productions. He was executive director of the NFB's Ontario Centre from 1982 until 1988.

Until it closed in 2002, The NFB's theatre in Toronto was named The John Spotton Theatre.
Until 2017, the Toronto International Film Festival Award for Best Canadian Short Film was the 'NFB John Spotton Award'.

Personal life and death
Spotton drowned at the age of 64 while on vacation in Cuba. He was survived by his wife Doris.

Filmography
For the National Film Board of Canada

Sing with the Commodores - 3 short films, Roger Blais & Douglas Tunstell 1951 - cinematographer 
Fighting Forest Fires with Hand Tools - training film, Lawrence Cherry 1951 - cinematographer
Trade Fair - documentary short, Robert Anderson  1952 - cinematographer 
The Puppeteers - documentary short, Jacques Giraldeau 1952 - cinematographer 
Epidemic Foot and Mouth Disease: Saskatchewan - documentary short, Larry Gosnell 1952 - cinematographer
Eye Witness No. 39 - documentary short, Gordon Burwash 1952 - cinematographer
Eye Witness No. 44 - documentary short, David Bairstow 1952 - cinematographer
Eye Witness No. 49 - documentary short, David Bairstow 1952 - cinematographer 
Eye Witness No. 50 - documentary short, David Bairstow 1953 - cinematographer
Pole Barns and Milking Parlours - documentary short, Larry Gosnell 1953 - cinematographer
The World at Your Feet - documentary short, Larry Gosnell 1953 - cinematographer 
The Story of Peter and the Potter - short film, Donald Peters 1953 - cinematographer 
Surface Silos - documentary short, Larry Gosnell 1953 - cinematographer 
Security Depends on You - training film, Julian Biggs 1953 - cinematographer 
Royal Canadian Ordnance Corps: Field Operations - training film, Lawrence Cherry 1953 - cinematographer 
Forage Harvesting - documentary short, Larry Gosnell 1953 - cinematographer 
Eye Witness No. 67 - documentary short, Fernand Ménard & Robert Anderson 1954 - cinematographer
Salt Cod - documentary short, Allan Wargon 1954 - cinematographer 
College in the Wilds - documentary short, Julian Biggs 1954 - cinematographer
Frontier College - documentary short, Julian Biggs 1954 - cinematographer 
The Doll Factory - documentary short, Julian Biggs 1954 - cinematographer 
Deep Sleep - documentary short, Jack Olsen, 1954 - cinematographer 
Auto Production - documentary short, Jack Olsen 1954 - cinematographer
Aviation Medicine - documentary short, Julian Biggs 1954 - cinematographer 
Food and Drug Patrol - documentary short, Allen Stark 1954 - cinematographer
Hidden Power - documentary short, John Feeney 1954 - cinematographer
Javanese Dancing - documentary short, Bernard Devlin 1954 - cinematographer
The Magic Men - documentary short, Jack Olen 1954 - cinematographer
Story of a Newspaper - documentary short, Julian Biggs 1954 - cinematographer 
Traffic Cop - documentary short, Jack Olsen 1954 - cinematographer
Food Facts - documentary short, John Feeney 1954 - cinematographer
Alcoholism - documentary short, Don Haldane 1955 - cinematographer
Grain Handling in Canada - documentary short, Guy L. Coté 1955 - cinematographer
Leaving It to the Experts - documentary short, Gudrun Parker 1955 - cinematographer
Community Responsibilities - documentary short, Gudrun Parker 1955 - cinematographer 
Eye Witness No. 84 - documentary short, Hector Lemieux & Tim Wilson 1956 - cinematographer
Designed for Living - documentary short, Jean Palardy 1956 - cinematographer
Aural Null - documentary short, Michael Birch 1957 - cinematographer 
The Jet Beacon Let-Down - documentary short, Michael Birch & René Jodoin 1957 - cinematographer 
The Standard Range Approach - training film, Michael Birch & René Jodoin 1957 - cinematographer 
Battalion Intelligence Section - documentary short, Walford Hewitson 1957 - cinematographer
Canadian Profile - documentary, Allan Wargon 1957 - cinematographer
Feathers in the Wind - documentary short, Raymond Garceau 1957 - cinematographer
Choosing a Leader - short film, Julia Murphy 1957 - cinematographer
Being Different - short film, Julia Murphy 1957 - cinematographer
A Day in June - documentary short, Louis Portugais 1958 - cinematographer 
Pilgrimage - documentary short (Candid Eye), Terence Macartney-Filgate 1958 - co-producer with Roman Kroitor and Wolf Koenig
The Skilled Worker - short film, Morten Parker 1958 - cinematographer 
The General Foreman - short film, Morten Parker 1958 - cinematographer
The Man on the Assembly Line - short film, Morten Parker 1958 - cinematographer
The Hands That Heal - documentary short, Gordon Sparling 1958 - cinematographer
Railroaders - documentary short, Guy L. Coté 1958 - cinematographer 
Treasure of the Forest - documentary short, Roger Blais 1958 - cinematographer 
Log Drive - documentary short, Raymond Garceau 1958 - cinematographer 
River of Wood - documentary short, Raymond Garceau 1958 - cinematographer
City Out of Time - documentary short, Colin Low 1959 - editor
The Back-Breaking Leaf - documentary short, Terence Macartney-Filgate 1959 - editor
Fishermen - documentary short, Guy L. Coté 1959 - cinematographer 
The St. Lawrence Seaway - documentary short, John Howe 1959 - cinematographer 
I Was a Ninety-Pound Weakling - documentary short, Wolf Koenig & Georges Dufaux 1960 - editor
Railroaders (Revised) - documentary short, Guy L. Coté 1960 - cinematographer
Circle of the Sun - documentary short, Colin Low 1960 - cinematographer
The Days of Whisky Gap - documentary short, Colin Low 1961 - editor and cinematographer
Lonely Boy - documentary short, Wolf Koenig & Roman Kroitor 1962 - editor
Runner - documentary short, Don Owen 1962 - cinematographer
Nobody Waved Good-bye - feature, Don Owen 1964 - editor and cinematographer 
Rivera - documentary, The American Worker series (non-NFB), Morten Parker 1964
The Hutterites - documentary short, Colin Low 1964 - editor and cinematographer
The Edge of the Barrens - documentary short, Dalton Muir 1964 - editor
Legault's Place - documentary short, Suzanne Angel 1965 - cinematographer 
Two Men of Montreal - documentary, Suzanne Angel, Donald Brittain & Don Owen 1965 - cinematographer 
Buster Keaton Rides Again - documentary, 1965 - editor, cinematographer, director
Memorandum - documentary 1965 - editor, cinematographer and, with Donald Brittain, director
Sanchez - documentary, The American Worker series (non-NFB), Morten Parker 1965
Ybarra - documentary, The American Worker series (non-NFB), Morten Parker 1966 
Never a Backward Step - documentary 1966 - with Donald Brittain & Arthur Hammond, director
The Forest - documentary short, 1966 - editor and director
The White Ship - documentary short, Hector Lemieux 1966 - editor 
The Long Haul Men - documentary short, Michael Rubbo 1966 - editor 
High Steel - documentary short, Don Owen 1966 - cinematographer
After Eve - documentary short, Michael J.F. Scott 1967 - editor
This Land - documentary short, Arthur Hammond 1968 - editor
Les voitures d'eau (The River Schooners) – feature, Pierre Perrault 1968 – co-editor with Guy L. Coté
Activator One - documentary 1969 - director
Of Many People - documentary short, Stanley Jackson 1970 - editor and co-producer with Robert Verrall
Pillar of Wisdom - documentary short, Josef Reeve 1970 - cinematographer
Kainai - documentary short, Don Owen 1973 - cinematographer
Circus World - documentary short, Roman Kroitor 1974 - cinematographer 
Have I Ever Lied to You Before? - documentary 1976 - director
Eaton’s Centre - televisit 1977 - producer and director
A Pinto for the Prince - documentary short 1979 - with Colin Low, director 
Meet the Martins - documentary short, William Pettigrew 1979 - co-producer with William Pettigrew
Viking Visitors to North America - documentary short, Tony Ianzelo & Anthony Kent 1979 - producer
Canada Vignettes: The Music Makers, Malca Gillson 1979 - producer
Atmos - documentary short, Colin Low 1980 - co-producer with Michael Sullivan
Home Feeling: Struggle for a Community - documentary, Jennifer Hodge de Silva & Roger McTair 1983 - executive producer
Prisoners of Debt: Inside the Global Banking Crisis - documentary, Robert Collison & Peter Raymont 1983 - executive producer
Thanks for the Ride - short film, John Kent Harrison 1983 - executive producer 
Pitchmen - documentary, Barry Greenwald 1985 - executive producer
Final Offer - documentary, Sturla Gunnarsson & Robert Collison 1985 - executive producer
Class of Promise - documentary, Barbara Sears 1985 - executive producer
Dad's House, Mom's House - documentary, Lyn Wright 1985 - executive producer
The Hospital - short film, Murray Battle 1985 - executive producer
Left Out - short film, Jim Purdy 1985 - executive producer
The Umpire - short film, Paul Shapiro 1985 - executive producer
Where's Pete? - short film, Jim Purdy, 1986 - executive producer
Mr. Nobody - documentary short, Lyn Wright 1987 - executive producer
Hayley's Home Movie - short film, Gail Singer 1987 - executive producer
No Way! Not Me - documentary short, Ariadna Ochrymovych 1987 - executive producer
For Richer, For Poorer - short film, Ariadna Ochrymovych 1988 - executive producer
A House Divided: Caregiver Stress and Elder Abuse - documentary short, Lyn Wright 1988 - executive producer
Peep and the Big Wide World - cartoons, Kaj Pindal 1988 - executive producer
Imperfect Union: Canadian Labour and the Left, Part 1 - International Background, Canadian Roots - documentary, Arthur Hammond 1989 - executive producer
Imperfect Union: Canadian Labour and the Left, Part 2 - Born of Hard Times - documentary, Arthur Hammond 1989 - executive producer
Imperfect Union: Canadian Labour and the Left, Part 3 - Falling Apart and Getting Together - documentary, Arthur Hammond 1989 - executive producer
Imperfect Union: Canadian Labour and the Left, Part 4 - New Party, Old Problems - documentary, Arthur Hammond 1989 - executive producer
Media and Society: Advertising and Consumerism - documentary, David Adkin 1989 - producer
Media and Society: Cultural Sovereignty/Shaping Information - documentary, David Adkin 1989 - producer 
Media and Society: Images of Women - documentary, David Adkin 1989 - producer 
Transplant, the Breath of Life - documentary, Elias Petras 1990 - co-producer with Elias Petras
Constructing Reality: Exploring Media Issues in Documentary - What Is a Documentary? Ways of Storytelling - documentary, David Adkin 1993 - co-producer with Michael Allder
Constructing Reality: Exploring Media Issues in Documentary - Shaping Reality - documentary, David Adkin 1993 - co-producer with Michael Allder
Constructing Reality: Exploring Media Issues in Documentary - The Politics of Truth - documentary, David Adkin 1993 - co-producer with Michael Allder
Constructing Reality: Exploring Media Issues in Documentary - The Candid Eye? - documentary, David Adkin 1993 - co-producer with Michael Allder
Constructing Reality: Exploring Media Issues in Documentary - Voices of Experience, Voices for Change Part 1 - documentary, David Adkin 1993 - co-producer with Michael Allder
Constructing Reality: Exploring Media Issues in Documentary - Voices of Experience, Voices for Change Part 2, The Poetry of Motion - documentary, David Adkin 1993 - co-producer with Michael Allder
Village of Idiots - animated short film, Eugene Fedorenko & Rose Newlove 1999 - executive producer

Awards

The Hutterites (1964)
 Montreal International Film Festival, Montreal: First Prize, Shorts, 1964
 Columbus International Film & Animation Festival, Columbus, Ohio: Chris Award, First Prize, Religion, 1964
 Yorkton Film Festival, Yorkton, Saskatchewan: Golden Sheaf Award, First Prize, Human Relations, 1964
 Melbourne Film Festival, Melbourne: Honorable Mention, 1964
 American Film and Video Festival, New York: Blue Ribbon, Doctrinal and Denominational Topics, 1965
 Landers Associates Awards, Los Angeles: Award of Merit
 Festival dei Popoli/International Film Festival on Social Documentary, Florence, Italy: Second Prize, 1965
 Canadian Cinematography Awards, Toronto - Best Black and White Cinematography, 1964
 16th Canadian Film Awards, Toronto - Special Award for Black and White Cinematography, 1964

Buster Keaton Rides Again (1965)
 18th Canadian Film Awards, Montreal: Best Film, General Information, 1966
 Montreal International Film Festival, Montreal: First Prize, Medium-Length Films, 1966
 Golden Gate International Film Festival, San Francisco: Silver Trophy, Documentary, 1966
 International Exhibition of the Documentary Film, Venice: CIDALC Special Prize, 1966
 American Film and Video Festival, New York: First Prize, Music, Literature & Films, 1967
 Melbourne Film Festival, Melbourne: Special Prize for Best Biographical Documentary, 1967
 MIFED International Contest of Public Relations, Milan: Gold Medal 1968
 20th British Academy Film Awards, London: Nominee: BAFTA Award for Best Documentary, 1967

Memorandum (1965)
 Venice Film Festival, Venice: First Prize, Lion of St. Mark, 1966
 Golden Gate International Film Festival, San Francisco: First Prize, Essay, 1966
 Vancouver International Film Festival, Vancouver: Certificate of Merit, Television Films, 1966
 Montreal International Film Festival, Montreal: Special Mention, Medium-Length Films, 1966

The Forest (1966)
 Yorkton Film Festival, Yorkton, Saskatchewan: Golden Sheaf Award, Best Film, Industry and Agriculture 1967
 Cork International Film Festival, Cork, Ireland: First Prize – Certificate of Merit, Industrial Films, 1966 

Never a Backward Step (1966) 
 American Film and Video Festival, New York: Blue Ribbon, First Prize, Biography & History, 1968
 20th Canadian Film Awards, Toronto: Best Documentary Over 30 Minutes, 1968

Thanks for the Ride (1983)
 American Film and Video Festival, New York: Blue Ribbon Award, Human Sexuality, 1985

Dad's House, Mom's House (1985)
 Columbus International Film & Animation Festival, Columbus, Ohio: Chris Award, Bronze Plaque, Health & Medicine, 1960

Final Offer (1985)
 Banff Mountain Film Festival, Banff, Alberta: Grand Prize of the Festival, 1986
 Banff Mountain Film Festival, Banff, Alberta: Rockie Award for Best Political and Social Documentary, 1986
 7th Genie Awards, Toronto: Best Feature Length Documentary, 1986
 Golden Gate International Film Festival, San Francisco: Special Jury Award, 1986
 Columbus International Film & Animation Festival, Columbus, Ohio: Chris Award, First Prize, Industry & Commerce, 1986
 Chicago International Film Festival, Chicago: Gold Plaque, Social/Political Documentary, 1986
 Prix Italia, International Competition for Radio and Television Productions, Lucca, Italy: Italia Award for Best Documentary, 1986

Left Out (1985)
 ATOM Awards, Melbourne, Australia: Certificate of Commendation, Short Educational Films & Videos, 1988

The Umpire (1985)
 American Film and Video Festival, Chicago: Red Ribbon Award, Children’s Fiction, 1986
 National Educational Media Network Competition, Oakland, California: First Place, Human Relations, 1985

Mr. Nobody (1987)
 American Film and Video Festival, New York: Red Ribbon Award, Special Needs/Elderly, 1988

A House Divided: Caregiver Stress and Elder Abuse (1988)
 American Film and Video Festival, New York: Red Ribbon Award, Special Needs/Elderly, 1990

Peep and the Big Wide World (1988)
 Ottawa International Animation Festival, Ottawa: Second Prize, Children's Animated Productions, Non-Series, 1988
 International Children's Film Festival, Chicago: Honorable Mention, Single Program Video Animation, 1988
 American Film and Video Festival, Chicago: Red Ribbon Award, Original Works for Children/Animation, 1992
 National Educational Media Network Competition, Oakland, California: Bronze Plaque Award, Literary Adaptations, K-2, 1992
 California Children's Media Awards, Los Angeles: Award for Excellence in Children's Video, 1992

Transplant, the Breath of Life (1990)
 International Festival of Red Cross and Health Films, Varna, Bulgaria: First Prize, Gold Medal, Popular Science, Documentary on Health and Ecological Subjects 1991

Village of Idiots (1999)
 CINANIMA International Animated Film Festival, Espinho, Portugal: RTP Internacional Jury Honorable Mention, 1999
 CINANIMA International Animated Film Festival, Espinho, Portugal: Special Jury Award, 1999
 CINANIMA International Animated Film Festival, Espinho, Portugal: Audience Award, 1999
 Vancouver International Film Festival, Vancouver: Best Animated Film, 1999
 Montreal World Film Festival, Montreal: FIPRESCI Award International Federation of Film Critics, 1999
 Montreal World Film Festival, Montreal: Second Prize, Short Films, 1999
 Writers Guild of Canada: Best Script, to John Lazarus, 1999
 Castelli Animati, Genzano di Roma, Italy: Grand Prize, 2000
 Curtas Vila do Conde International Film Festival, Vila do Conde, Portugal: Grand Prize for Animation, 2000
 International Jewish Video Competition of the Judah L. Magnes Museum, Berkeley, California: First Prize, Animation, 2000
 Hiroshima International Animation Festival, Hiroshima, Japan: Renzo Kinoshita Award, 2000
 Palm Springs International Festival of Short Films, Palm Springs, California: Second Place, Animation, 2000
 Animafest Zagreb, Zagreb, Croatia: Second Prize, 2000
 Message to Man International Film Festival, St. Petersburg, Russia – Centaur Award for Best Animation, 2000
 Annecy International Animation Film Festival, Annecy, France: Special Jury Award, 2000
 Brisbane International Film Festival, Brisbane, Australia: Special Jury Award, 2000
 Melbourne International Animation Festival, Melbourne: Award for Best of International Session 6, 2001
 California SUN International Animation Festival, Los Angeles: Silver Star Award for Best Experimental Animation, 2001
 21st Genie Awards, Toronto – Genie Award for Best Animated Short, 2001
 New York International Children's Film Festival, New York: Grand Prize Audience Award, 2002

References

External links
John Spotton Buster Keaton Rides Again and Memorandum (films streamed online)

1927 births
1991 deaths
National Film Board of Canada people
Canadian documentary film producers
Canadian documentary film directors
Canadian cinematographers
Canadian film editors
Deaths by drowning
Accidental deaths in Cuba
Place of birth missing
Film directors from Toronto
Best Cinematography Genie and Canadian Screen Award winners
Directors of Genie and Canadian Screen Award winners for Best Documentary Film